He Yingqiang (Chinese: 何英强; born 1965) is a male Chinese weightlifter. He competed at 1988 Seoul Olympics and won a silver medal in Men's 52–56 kg. 4 years later, He won a bronze medal at 1992 Barcelona Olympics in Men's 56–60 kg.

References

External links
 

Chinese male weightlifters
Olympic weightlifters of China
Olympic silver medalists for China
Olympic bronze medalists for China
Weightlifters at the 1988 Summer Olympics
Weightlifters at the 1992 Summer Olympics
Medalists at the 1988 Summer Olympics
Medalists at the 1992 Summer Olympics
Living people
1965 births
Olympic medalists in weightlifting
Asian Games medalists in weightlifting
Weightlifters at the 1986 Asian Games
Weightlifters at the 1990 Asian Games
Asian Games gold medalists for China
Medalists at the 1986 Asian Games
Medalists at the 1990 Asian Games
20th-century Chinese people